Godiya Akwashiki (born 3 August 1973) in Angba Iggah of Nasarawa State, Nigeria is a Nigerian politician. He is the current senator representing Nasarawa North senatorial district in Nasarawa State. He was elected into the senate during the 2019 general elections of Nigeria. Akwashiki was re-elected during the 2023 general election. Before being elected into the senate he was the Deputy Speaker of the Nasarawa State House of Assembly.

Early Life and education

Akwashiki was born in 1973 to Mr Akwashiki Walaro and Mrs Ramatu Akwashiki in Angba Iggah, Nasarawa Eggon local government area in Nasarawa State. He attended the Government Primary School, Angba Iggah where he finished with his First School Leaving Certificate in 1987. In 1988 he enrolled into the Government Technical College, Assakio and graduated with the Senior Secondary Certificate in Education (WASSCE) in 1993.

Akwashiki enrolled into the Nasarawa State University, Keffi and graduated with a Bachelor of Science in Business Administration in 2010. He is married with children

Political Career

From 2011 to 2019, Akwashiki, under the platform of the People's Democratic Party was a member of the Nasarawa State Assembly. During his first term (2011-2015), he was the Majority Leader in the State Assembly. In his second term (2015-2019), he was appointed the Deputy Speaker of the State Assembly, a position he held until 2019 when, under the All Progressives Congress (APC), he contested for and won the Nasarawa North senatorial seat.

He is currently the Chairman of the Senate Committee on Inter-parliamentary Affairs and Vice Chairman of the Media and Public Affairs Committee.

References

Members of the Senate (Nigeria)
Living people
People from Nasarawa State
All Progressives Congress politicians
1973 births